For centuries, both Bibi and Khanum have been used as honorific titles for women across many regions. 

Bibi Khanum may refer to:

People 
 Saray Mulk Khanum (c. 1341 – 1408), empress consort of the Timurid Empire
 Bibi Khanoom Astarabadi  (1858/9 – 1921), Iranian writer and satirist

Architecture 
 Bibi-Khanym Mosque, a large mosque in Samarkand, Uzbekistan